The Enterococcaceae are a family of Gram-positive bacteria placed in the order Lactobacillales.
Representative genera include  Enterococcus, Melissococcus, Pilibacter, Tetragenococcus, and Vagococcus. In this family are some important lactic acid bacteria which produce lactic acid as the major metabolic end product.

References

External links
 Enterococcaceae J.P. Euzéby: List of Prokaryotic names with Standing in Nomenclature

 
Lactobacillales